Conradiidae is a taxonomic family (created in 1987 by Golikov & Starobogatov) of very small sea snails, marine gastropod molluscs or micromolluscs. These genera were previously included in the polyphyletic family Skeneidae. They belong within the clade Vetigastropoda, and the superfamily Trochoidea.

Genera
 Conjectura Finlay, 1926
 Conradia A. Adams, 1860
 Crossea A. Adams, 1865
 Crosseola Iredale, 1924
 Crossolida Rubio & Rolán, 2019

References

 Golikov, A. N.; Starobogatov, Ya. I. (1987). Sistema otriada Cerithiiformes i ego polozhenie v podklasse Pectinibranchia [Systematics of the order Cerithiiformes and its position within the subclass Pectinibranchia]. Vsesoiuznoe soveshchanie po izucheniiu molliuskov [Leningrad]. 8: 23−28.
 Hickman, C. S. (2013). Crosseolidae, a new family of skeneiform microgastropods and progress toward definition of monophyletic Skeneidae. American Malacological Bulletin. 31(1): 1-16
 Bouchet P., Rocroi J.P., Hausdorf B., Kaim A., Kano Y., Nützel A., Parkhaev P., Schrödl M. & Strong E.E. (2017). Revised classification, nomenclator and typification of gastropod and monoplacophoran families. Malacologia. 61(1-2): 1-526

External links
 Hickman C.S. (2013) Crosseolidae, a new family of skeneiform microgastropods and progress toward definition of monophyletic Skeneidae. American Malacological Bulletin 31(1): 1-16 (abstract)

 
Trochoidea (superfamily)